"Elephant in the room" or "elephant in the living room"  is an idiom referring to an obvious truth that is ignored, and may also refer to:

Film and television
 "The Elephant in the Room", a 2006 episode of the American television drama Commander in Chief
 Patrice O'Neal: Elephant in the Room, a 2011 stand-up comedy special by Patrice O'Neal
 The Elephant in the Living Room (film), a 2011 documentary about raising exotic animals in the United States
 Elephant in the Room (2016 film), a Nigerian romantic comedy film

Music
 The Elephant in the Room (album), a 2008 musical album by Fat Joe
 "Elephant In The Room", a song from the Thundamentals album So We Can Remember

Other uses
 The Elephant in the Room (book), a 2006 book by Ryan Sager
 Elephant in the Room, a play by Dan Fogler
 The Room in the Elephant, a restaurant in Torquay, Devon, England